Faith Janine Shirley Mallonga Nisperos (born January 2, 2000) is a Filipino volleyball player. She attended Ateneo de Davao University grade school in her elementary years, and Nazareth School of National University during her high school years. She currently plays for the Ateneo Lady Eagles in the UAAP.

Clubs
  Balipure-NU Water Defenders (2018) 
  Ateneo Lady Blue Eagles (2019-present)

Awards

Individual
 2013 UAAP Season 76 Juniors - "Rookie of the Year"
 2014 UAAP Season 77 Juniors - "Season's Most Valuable Player"
 2015 UAAP Season 78 Juniors - "Best Attacker" and "Finals' Most Valuable Player"
 2016 UAAP Season 79 Juniors - "1st Best Outside Hitter" and "Season's Most Valuable Player"
 2017 UAAP Season 80 Juniors - "1st Best Outside Hitter" and "Finals' Most Valuable Player"
 2022 UAAP Season 84 Women’s - "2nd Best Outside Hitter"
 2015 Shakey's Girls Volleyball League Season 12 - NCR Leg "Best Middle Blocker" and "Most Valuable Player"'''
 2015 Shakey's Girls Volleyball League Season 12 - League of Champions "Best Outside Hitter" 2016 Shakey's Girls Volleyball League Season 13 - NCR Leg "Best Outside Hitter" and "Most Valuable Player" 2016 Shakey's Girls Volleyball League Season 13 National Finals - "Best Outside Hitter" 2016 Shakey's Girls Volleyball League Season 13 International Championship - "Most Valuable Player" 2015 Palarong Pambansa - "Best Blocker" and "Most Valuable Player" 2019 Premier Volleyball League Collegiate Conference - "2nd Best Outside Hitter" 2022 V-League Women's Division Season 14 Collegiate Challenge - "1st Best Outside Hitter" and "Conference and Finals Most Valuable Player"''

Collegiate team
 2019 Premier Volleyball League Collegiate Conference −  Bronze medal,  with Ateneo Lady Eagles
 UAAP Season 84 women's volleyball tournament −  Bronze medal,  with Ateneo Lady Eagles

References

 
 2000 births
Living people
University Athletic Association of the Philippines volleyball players